Urt or URT may refer to:

 Urt, a village in France
 Gare d'Urt, a railway station in Urt
 Urt, Iran, a village in Iran
 Surat Thani Airport, in the Phunphin, Surat Thani, Thailand
 União Recreativa dos Trabalhadores, a Brazilian football (soccer) club
 Unión de Rugby de Tucumán, a rugby governing organisation in Tucumán province, Argentina
 Union Refrigerator Transit Line, an American refrigerated rail car line
 United Republic of Tanzania, a country in East Africa
 Urat language of Papua New Guinea, ISO 639-3 code
 The UnReal Times, Indian satire portal
 Upper Respiratory Tract